The Thul Mir Rukan (Sindhi: ٺلهه مير رڪڻ) is a Buddhist stupa, built possibly between the 6th to 11th century CE, near the modern cities of Kazi Ahmed and Daulatpur in the Sindh province of Pakistan. This monument has domed ceiling and it is 60 feet high, constructed with baked bricks. Details indicate the site being a religious Buddhist center since antiquity. Many evidences were explored from this site are related to Gautama Buddha.

References

Stupas in Pakistan
Buddhist temples in Pakistan